William Henry Harrison Reddick (1840–1903) was an American Civil War Medal of Honor recipient. He received the Medal of Honor for his actions during the Andrews Raid, also known as the Great Locomotive Chase or the Mitchell Raid. Reddick was born on September 18, 1840 in Locust Grove, Ohio, and died on November 8, 1903 in Muscatine, Iowa. He is buried at the Lettsville Cemetery in Letts, Iowa. He worked as a farmer after his discharge from the military.

Military service 

William H. Reddick enlisted with the 33rd Ohio Infantry on August 18, 1861. In the spring of 1862, he volunteered to join a group selected from three Ohio regiments by James J. Andrews. Their mission was to steal a train in Georgia and destroy railway facilities. The operation ultimately was unsuccessful, and Reddick was imprisoned in Atlanta, along with thirteen of the other raiders (Andrews and seven others were executed.) He attempted to escape in October of 1862, but was recaptured and sent to Castle Thunder Prison in Richmond, Virginia in December, 1862. After a prisoner exchange in March, 1863, he traveled to Washington, DC where he and five of his fellow raiders received the Medal of Honor. They were the first recipients of the medal.

Medal of Honor citation 
Reddick was awarded the Medal of Honor on March 25, 1863 for his actions in April of 1862. He was the sixth individual to receive the medal. The citation reads:

References

External links
 

1840 births
1903 deaths
American Civil War recipients of the Medal of Honor
Union Army officers